Keeta is a genus of leaf beetles in the subfamily Eumolpinae. It contains two species endemic to the Aldabra atoll in the Seychelles. The genus and both species were described by the Indian entomologist Samarendra Maulik, from specimens collected by the Percy Sladen Trust Expedition to the Indian Ocean in 1908. The generic name comes from the Sanskrit word  (kīṭa), meaning "insect".

Species
 Keeta aldabrana Maulik, 1931
 Keeta fryeri Maulik, 1931

References

Eumolpinae
Chrysomelidae genera
Beetles of Africa
Insects of Seychelles
Endemic fauna of Seychelles